Bill Schmeling (died September 12, 2019), better known by his pen name The Hun, was an American artist, known for his explicit, homoerotic fetish illustrations and comics.

Biography 

Bill Schmeling began producing erotic art in the 1960s, doing work for Physique Pictorial and other beefcake magazines, initially under the name Torro. Using the pen name The Hun, he produced series of comics – Hun Comics and Gohr – featuring fantasy sexual adventures of gay men. Stories by Schmeling were regular features in Meatmen, and in 1998, the Tom of Finland Company published The Hun Book, a collection of his work. Recurring characters in his comics include Big Sig (a naïve but sexually adventurous, semi-literate young man) and Gohr (a barbarian living in a brutal, post-apocalyptic world). His art is characterized by hypermasculine characters with exaggerated muscles, nipples, and genitalia. Sex scenes routinely involve BDSM with an emphasis on body fluids. Interracial sex scenes are common.

In 1993 Schmeling received the Business of the Year award as part of the Pantheon of Leather Awards. In 1999 he and Hardy Haberman received the Steve Maidhof Award for National or International Work from the National Leather Association International. In 2004 he received the Northwest Regional Award as part of the Pantheon of Leather Awards.

In 2019, Schmeling donated all of his artwork, notes, and other materials to the Leather Archives & Museum in Chicago.

Schmeling lived in Portland, Oregon.

References 

American cartoonists
Artists from Portland, Oregon
BDSM people
American gay artists
LGBT comics creators
Pseudonymous artists
Underground cartoonists
Year of birth missing
Place of birth missing
Fetish artists
Gay male BDSM
Gay male pornographic comics
2019 deaths
Gay male erotica artists